The 1991–92 Evansville Purple Aces men's basketball team represented the University of Evansville in the 1991–92 NCAA Division I men's basketball season. Their head coach was Jim Crews and they played their home games at Roberts Municipal Stadium as members of the Midwestern Collegiate Conference. After winning the MCC regular season championship, the Purple Aces won the MCC tournament to receive an automatic bid to the 1992 NCAA tournament. They were defeated by UTEP in the opening round and finished 24–6 (8–2 MCC).

Roster

Schedule

|-
!colspan=9 style=| Regular season

|-
!colspan=9 style=| MCC tournament

|-
!colspan=9 style=| NCAA tournament

Rankings

Awards and honors
Parrish Casebier – MCC Player of the Year

References

Evansville Purple Aces
Evansville Purple Aces men's basketball seasons
Evansville
Evans
Evans